WISEA J181006.18-101000.5 or WISEA 1810-1010 is a substellar object in the constellation Serpens about 8.9 parsec or 29 light-years distant from earth. It stands out because of its peculiar colors matching both L-type and T-type objects, likely due to its very low metallicity. Together with WISEA 0414−5854 it is the first discovered extreme subdwarf (esd) of spectral type T. Lodieu et al. describe WISEA 1810-1010 as a water vapor dwarf due to its atmosphere being dominated by hydrogen and water vapor.

Discovery 
WISEA 1810-1010 was first identified with the NEOWISE proper motion survey in 2016, but the proper motion could not be confirmed because of the high density of background stars in this field near the galactic plane. In 2020 the object was re-examined with the WiseView tool by the researchers of the Backyard Worlds project and was found to have significant proper motion. Additionally the object was independently discovered by the citizen scientist Arttu Sainio via the Backyard Worlds project.

Observations 
The object was initially observed by the Backyard Worlds researchers from US and Canada with Keck/NIRES and Palomar/TripleSpec. Later it was observed by another team from Spain, UK and Poland with NOT/ALFOSC, GTC/multiple instruments and Calar Alto/Omega2000.

Analysis of the Keck and Palomar spectrum found that WISEA 1810-1010 has much deeper 1.15 μm (Y/J-band) absorption when compared to the extreme subdwarf of spectral type L7 2MASS 0532+8246, but the shape of the H-band is similar to this esdL7. The Y- and J-band spectrum does match better with spectra from subdwarfs with early spectral type T.

Distance and physical properties 

It might be a later spectral type, because subdwarfs of spectral type L are generally warmer than field type objects.

The tentative spectral type by Schneider et al. is based on a larger distance and a higher temperature, which does not reflect the most recent knowledge about this object.

Atmosphere 
The only chemicals detected in the atmosphere of WISEA 1810-1010 are hydrogen and strong absorption due to water vapor. This is surprising because T-dwarfs are defined by methane in their atmosphere and the hotter L-dwarfs are partly defined by carbon monoxide in their atmosphere. Both are missing in WISEA 1810-1010. The missing of carbon monoxide and methane can be explained by a carbon-deficient and metal-poor atmosphere. Alternatively the spectrum could be explained by an oxygen-enhanced atmosphere.

See also 

 2MASSI J0937347+293142 first subdwarf of spectral type T
 WISE 1534–1043 likely first subdwarf of spectral type Y
 List of star systems within 25–30 light-years

Notes

References 

Brown dwarfs
Serpens (constellation)
Subdwarfs